Larry Benard McDonald (born November 24, 1967) is a former Major League Baseball pitcher. The first overall pick in the 1989 MLB Draft, McDonald played for the Baltimore Orioles and Milwaukee Brewers from 1989 through 1997.

Baseball career

College
A collegiate star at Louisiana State University who also played varsity basketball there, McDonald stands 6'7". He also led the 1988 US Olympic Team to a gold medal for baseball, winning complete games against host South Korea and Puerto Rico. During his three-year college career at LSU, McDonald twice helped his team reach the College World Series. He gave up a notable walk-off grand slam to Stanford's Paul Carey in the 1987 series. His best collegiate season came in 1989, which he finished with a 14–4 record, a 3.49 ERA, and a Southeastern Conference record 202 strikeouts. That year, he was selected as a member of the All-America team, and he won the Golden Spikes Award. In 1989, he played collegiate summer baseball with the Orleans Cardinals of the Cape Cod Baseball League, recording one start.

Minor leagues
That summer, the Baltimore Orioles made McDonald the first overall selection in the June draft. He is the only LSU Tiger to have been drafted number one, and is followed by shortstop Alex Bregman who was selected while he was a junior with the second pick in the first round of the 2015 MLB draft.

He had earlier been chosen by the Atlanta Braves in the 27th round of the 1986 draft, but decided to go to college at that time instead of signing. He signed with the Orioles on August 19, and on September 6, he made his major league debut. McDonald was the second member of his draft class to reach the majors, coming up three days after his Olympic teammate John Olerud.

Baltimore Orioles
In the finale of the 1989 season, McDonald tossed one scoreless inning of relief versus the American League East champion Toronto Blue Jays, logging his first career win.  Of note, he would become the sixth player to make the majors in the same season that he was selected as the number one overall pick in the Major League Baseball Amateur Draft. 

McDonald joined the Orioles' starting rotation in 1990, and in his first major league start on July 21, he threw a complete game shutout against the Chicago White Sox. At the end of the season, he finished eighth in Rookie of the Year voting, with the award going to catcher Sandy Alomar Jr. McDonald would go on to spend seven seasons with the Orioles, before leaving as a free agent in 1996 to join the Milwaukee Brewers. He never led his league in a major category, but ranked among the top 10 at various times in categories such as complete games, wins, ERA, WHIP, and strikeouts. McDonald was the first #1 draft pick to win his first three starts in Major League history, a feat which has been equalled by Gerrit Cole.

Milwaukee Brewers
While with the Brewers, McDonald began to encounter shoulder problems, missing part of the 1997 season. He was traded to the Cleveland Indians that offseason, in a deal that brought Marquis Grissom and Jeff Juden to Milwaukee in exchange for him, Mike Fetters, and Ron Villone. McDonald would never pitch for the Indians, though, as an operation to repair his rotator cuff on February 26, 1998 proved unsuccessful. He was ultimately forced to retire, and the Brewers sent Mark Watson to Cleveland to resolve their obligation in the matter.

McDonald ended his career with a 78–70 record, 894 strikeouts, and a 3.91 ERA in 1,291 innings pitched. He never pitched in the postseason.

In 2008, McDonald was elected to the College Baseball Hall of Fame.

Post-baseball career
McDonald is a color commentator for Orioles telecasts on MASN. He served as an assistant coach for the Denham Springs High School softball team in Denham Springs, Louisiana. He also is a color analyst for the NCAA Baseball Tournament on ESPN. McDonald and his wife Nicole have a son and a daughter. Son Jase McDonald is a pitcher for LSU-Eunice.

References

External links

1967 births
Living people
Denham Springs High School alumni
Baltimore Orioles players
Milwaukee Brewers players
Major League Baseball pitchers
Baseball players at the 1988 Summer Olympics
Baseball players from Baton Rouge, Louisiana
LSU Tigers baseball players
LSU Tigers basketball players
Orleans Firebirds players
Golden Spikes Award winners
Frederick Keys players
Hagerstown Suns players
Rochester Red Wings players
National College Baseball Hall of Fame inductees
Medalists at the 1988 Summer Olympics
Olympic gold medalists for the United States in baseball
All-American college baseball players
Major League Baseball broadcasters
Baltimore Orioles announcers
American men's basketball players
Anchorage Glacier Pilots players